Ouette is a genus of spiders in the family Ochyroceratidae. It was first described in 1998 by Michael Saaristo. , it contains 2 species:

References

Ochyroceratidae
Araneomorphae genera
Spiders of Africa
Spiders of China
Taxa named by Michael Saaristo